Tephraciura flavimacula is a species of tephritid or fruit flies in the genus Tephraciura of the family Tephritidae.

Distribution
Madagascar.

References

Tephritinae
Insects described in 1991
Diptera of Africa